Lieutenant Charles L. Barrell (August 1, 1842 – April 18, 1914) was an American soldier who fought in the American Civil War. Barrell was awarded the country's highest award for bravery during combat, the Medal of Honor, for his action near Camden, South Carolina, in April 1865.

Biography
Born August 1, 1842 in Conquest, Cayuga County, New York to Joseph Barrel and Emily Carey.  On 2 August 1862 Barrell enlisted at Leighton, Allegan County, Michigan into Company C of the 102d U.S. Colored Troops as a flag holder for the Grand Army of the Republic. He attained the rank of First Lieutenant on 3 January 1863. He was awarded the Medal of Honor was presented with the award on 14 May 1891.

Barrel died in Ann Arbor, Michigan and is buried at Hooker Cemetery, Wayland, MI.

Medal of Honor citation

See also

List of American Civil War Medal of Honor recipients: A–F

External links
 Charles L. Barrell bio on Find A Grave

References

1842 births
1914 deaths
People of Michigan in the American Civil War
Union Army officers
United States Army Medal of Honor recipients
American Civil War recipients of the Medal of Honor